Simon Adut Yuang (died 9 September 2018) was a South Sudanese Anglican bishop. He served as the Anglican Bishop of Yirol, located within the Province of the Episcopal Church of South Sudan, from 2015 until his death in a plane crash on 9 September, 2018.

In January 2015, the incumbent Bishop of Yirol, Daniel Deng Abeil, died from cancer. Simon Adut Yuang was elected as Deng Abeil's successor in May 2015. He was consecrated and enthroned as Bishop of Yirol in July 2015.

Simon Adut Yuang was killed in a plane crash in Yirol on September 9, 2018, along with at least 19 passengers and crew. The plane was en route from Juba International Airport to Yirol Airport when it crashed into Lake Yirol.

Bishop Simon Adut Yuang was survived by his wife and six children.

References

2018 deaths
South Sudanese Anglican bishops
South Sudanese Episcopalians
21st-century Anglican bishops in Africa
Victims of aviation accidents or incidents in South Sudan
Victims of aviation accidents or incidents in 2018
Anglican bishops of Yirol